"Why Can't I Be You?" is a song by the English rock band The Cure, released as the lead single from their 1987 album Kiss Me, Kiss Me, Kiss Me.

History
"Why Can't I Be You?" was the first single released from the album Kiss Me, Kiss Me, Kiss Me—the band's seventh LP. On 14 April 1987, it peaked at number 21 on UK Singles Chart. In the United States that same year, the song reached number 54 on the Billboard Hot 100, while a remix of the track charted at numbers eight and 27 on the Hot Dance Music/Maxi-Singles Sales and the Dance Music/Club Play Singles charts, respectively.

The video for "Why Can't I Be You?" was filmed in early 1987, in between rehearsals for The Cure's first South American tour. It was directed by Tim Pope, a past video collaborator of the group's. Filmed in a Ardmore Studios in Bray, County Wicklow, Ireland, the video featured the band members performing what biographer Jeff Apter referred to as "some of the most poorly choreographed dancing ever seen on MTV". All five band members wore costumes: Robert Smith dressed as a bear and as school-girl in a pinafore dress, Simon Gallup was costume as both a crow and a Morris dancer, Porl Thompson was a Scotsman as well as cross-dressed, Boris Williams was a schoolgirl & a vampire and Lol Tolhurst wore blackface and then a bumblebee costume. Pope referred to the clip as "the video I've always wanted to make".

Reception
In the NME'''s review of the single, writer Donald McRae singled out Smith's voice as the sole element of the song that "doesn't shout 'TEEN FUN'". Nonetheless, he praised the band, and concluded, "Shameless and cheap enough to steal Wham's 'Young Guns' riff, this ditty will soon be another Top of the Pops cracker".

Stewart Mason of Allmusic described the song as having "the remarkable ability to be simultaneously incredibly catchy and frankly rather annoying", noting it as an " antic, herky-jerky" successor to previous singles such as "Let's Go to Bed" and "The Lovecats". Stephen Thomas Erlewine, also of Allmusic, called it "deceptively bouncy" and noted it as a high point of the album and helps make it "one of the group's very best".

Track listing
7" Fiction / Fics 25 (UK)
 "Why Can't I Be You?" (3:12)
 "A Japanese Dream" (3:27)

2x7" Fiction / Ficsg 25 (UK)
 "Why Can't I Be You?" (3:13)
 "A Japanese Dream" (3:30)
 "Six Different Ways (Live)" (3:32)
 "Push (Live)" (4:42)
Live tracks taken from the concert film The Cure in Orange

12" Fiction / Ficsx 25 (UK)
 "Why Can't I Be You? (12" Remix)" (7:58)
 "A Japanese Dream (12" Remix)" (5:42)
Remixed by François Kevorkian and Ron St. Germain

CD Video / 080 184-2 (UK)
 "Why Can't I Be You? (12" Remix)" (8:10)
 "A Japanese Dream (12" Remix)" (5:52)
 "Hey You!!!" (2:23)
 "Why Can't I Be You? (Video)" (3:31)
Video directed by Tim Pope

Personnel
Robert Smith - Vocals, Guitar
Porl Thompson - Guitar
Simon Gallup - Bass
Boris Williams - Drums
François Kevorkian, Roy St. Germain - Remix

Cover versions
In June 2021 the female-fronted band Berlin Banter released a Trip Hop remake of "Why Can't I Be You?".

References
Apter, Jeff. Never Enough: The Story of The Cure''. Omnibus Press, 2005. .

Notes

External links

1987 singles
The Cure songs
Songs written by Robert Smith (musician)
Music videos directed by Tim Pope
1987 songs
Fiction Records singles
Songs written by Boris Williams
Songs written by Simon Gallup
Songs written by Porl Thompson
Songs written by Lol Tolhurst
Song recordings produced by David M. Allen